X-Men are a fictional team of superheroes appearing in American comic books published by Marvel Comics.

X-Men or X Men may also refer to:

Marvel X-Men franchise

Comics 
 List of X-Men comics
 X-Men: Legacy or X-Men (vol. 2), 1991 comic series
 X-Men: The Manga, 12-volume series published from 1998 to 1999 in Japan
 X-Men (comic book), the name of several comic book titles

Animated TV series 
 X-Men: Pryde of the X-Men, a 1989 animated pilot
 X-Men: The Animated Series, a 1992 Fox animated series
 X-Men '97, an upcoming 2023 Disney+ animated series, a revival of the 1992 series
 X-Men: Evolution, a 2000 animated series
 Wolverine and the X-Men, a 2009 animated series
 X-Men, a 2011 Japanese Marvel anime television series

Live action film 
X-Men (film series), theatrical films

X-Men (2000), first feature film in the series
 X2 (2003)
 X-Men: The Last Stand (2006)
 X-Men: First Class (2011)
 X-Men: Days of Future Past (2014)
 X-Men: Apocalypse (2016)
 X-Men Origins: Wolverine (2009)
 The Wolverine (2013)
 Logan (2017)
 Deadpool (2016), a spin-off focusing on the eponymous character
 Deadpool 2 (2018)
 Dark Phoenix (2019)
 The New Mutants (2020), a spin-off focusing on the eponymous team

Games  

 X-Men (1992 video game), arcade game
 X-Men (1993 video game) by Sega
 X-Men (Game Gear video game) (1994)

Other 
 The X-Men, American turntablist group The X-Ecutioners
 X-Men, men's teams among the St. Francis Xavier athletic teams

See also 

 X-Man (disambiguation)
 Uncanny X-Men (band), an Australian rock band